Podalia gamelia is a moth of the family Megalopygidae. It was described by Herbert Druce in 1904.

References

Moths described in 1904
Megalopygidae